Tatyana Gudkova (born 23 December 1978) is a Russian race walker.

International competitions

References

1978 births
Living people
Russian female racewalkers
Olympic female racewalkers
Olympic athletes of Russia
Athletes (track and field) at the 2000 Summer Olympics
World Athletics Championships athletes for Russia
Russian Athletics Championships winners
21st-century Russian women